Harish Kumar (1979 - 2 June 2019) popularly known as Queen Harish was a folk dancer from Rajasthan, India. A person who worked towards revival of Rajasthani folk dances, his performances included various folk dance forms from Rajasthan like Ghoomar, Kalbelia, Chang, Bhawai and Chari.

Biography

Harish Kumar was born in 1979, in a carpenter family in Suthar community in Jaisalmer in Rajasthan. He started dancing at the age of 13. Harish, who lost his parents, comes to drag dance to take care of his sisters. Inspired by 'Annu Master', the first drag performer in the Jaisalmer region, he started learning drag dance under him. He practiced American tribal style belly dance to make his body more capable of all feminine movements.

Harish had performed Ghoomar, Kalbelia, Chang, Bhavai, Chari, and other folk dances of the Rajasthan state, in nearly 60 countries. His performance was one of the highlights of the annual Jaipur Literary Fest. He has participated in Raqs Congree in Brussels, Belly Dancing Championship in Seoul and Desilicious in New York City. He has appeared in the reality television show 'India's Got Talent' and several Bollywood movies including Appudappudu (2003), Jai Gangaajal (2016) and The Accidental Prime Minister. In 2007, he starred in the documentary When the Road Bends… Tales of a Gypsy Caravan by American filmmaker Jasmine Dellal. In collaboration with the government of Rajasthan, he ran a daily evening show at Jaisalmer called The Queen Harish Show. He was also a choreographer with over two thousand students in Japan alone.

Personal life and death
Harish is survived by his wife and two sons. He died at the age of 39, on 2019 June 2, in a road accident in a Highway in Kaparda village near Jodhpur in Rajasthan.

References 

1979 births
2019 deaths
Folk dancers
Indian male dancers
Dancers from Rajasthan
21st-century Indian dancers
People from Jaisalmer
Indian drag queens